WMAW may refer to:

 WMAW-FM, a radio station (88.1 FM) licensed to Meridian, Mississippi, United States
 WMAW-TV, a television station (channel 28, virtual 14) licensed to Meridian, Mississippi, United States
 The World Movement Against War, an anti-war organisation established in 1932 by Comintern and best known for its Australian chapter, the Movement Against War and Fascism